The Ridgeley School is a historic Rosenwald school building at 8605 Central Avenue in Capitol Heights, Maryland.  It is a single-story wood-frame structure with a hip roof, built in 1927 with funding support from the Rosenwald Fund.  Originally built with two classrooms, a third was added later.  In 2009-11 the property underwent restoration and conversion for use as a local history museum.  It is one of four two-room Rosenwald schools built in Prince George's County.

The building was listed on the National Register of Historic Places in 2015.

See also
National Register of Historic Places listings in Prince George's County, Maryland

References

African-American history of Prince George's County, Maryland
Buildings and structures in Maryland
School buildings on the National Register of Historic Places in Maryland
School buildings completed in 1927
National Register of Historic Places in Prince George's County, Maryland
Rosenwald schools in Maryland
1927 establishments in Maryland